The Netball Super League is a top level netball league featuring teams from the United Kingdom. The league is organised by England Netball but features teams based in England, Wales and Scotland. The league was commenced playing at the 2005–06 season, replacing the Super Cup as the elite netball competition in England. Since 2016 the league has been sponsored by VitalityHealth and, as a result, it is also known as the Vitality Netball Superleague.

Historically the league's most successful teams are Team Bath, who have won five titles, and the Mavericks, who have played in seven grand finals. In more recent times, Surrey Storm won successive titles in 2015 and 2016 and Wasps have played in three successive finals, winning two titles, between 2017 and 2019. In 2019 Manchester Thunder won their third title. Umpire Gary Burgess made history in 2018 by umpiring his 10th consecutive Netball Superleague final between Manchester Thunder and Surrey Storm. Loughborough Lightning won their first title in 2021, beating Team Bath.

Teams

Current teams

Notes
  Between 2001 and 2012, Manchester Thunder played as Northern Thunder. 
  Saracens Mavericks previously played as Galleria Mavericks, Hertfordshire Mavericks and benecosMavericks.
  Surrey Storm originally played as Brunel Hurricanes.

Former teams

Notes
  Between 2005–06 and 2011, Yorkshire Jets played as Leeds Carnegie.

History

Grand Finals

Winners

Sponsorship

Television
Sky Sports are the Netball Superleague's official broadcast partner and they broadcast live  matches throughout the season. In November 2016 
England Netball and Sky Sports signed a four-year deal which saw every live match made available to all Sky TV customers on Sky Sports Mix. A "multi-year deal" was reached in 2021, which expanded Sky's coverage to allow for all matches to be either televised on Sky Sports or streamed via YouTube.

References

 
Netball competitions in the United Kingdom
Netball leagues
2005 establishments in the United Kingdom
Sports leagues established in 2005
Women's sports leagues in the United Kingdom
Professional sports leagues in the United Kingdom